In politics, gridlock or deadlock or political stalemate is a situation when there is difficulty passing laws that satisfy the needs of the people. A government is gridlocked when the ratio between bills passed and the agenda of the legislature decreases. Gridlock can occur when two legislative houses, or the executive branch and the legislature are controlled by different political parties, or otherwise cannot agree.

United States

In United States politics, gridlock frequently refers to occasions when the House of Representatives and the Senate are controlled by different parties, or by a different party than the party of the president. Gridlock may also occur within the Senate, when no party has a filibuster-proof majority.

Political Gridlock by author Ned Witting identifies many of the causes of gridlock in the United States and outlines ways to get government working again.

Law professors such as Sanford Levinson and Adrian Vermeule, as well as political commentators such as Matthew Yglesias and Debbie Parks, have criticized the U.S. Constitution and Senate voting rules for enabling situations of legislative gridlock. Along these lines, David Brady, a professor of political science at Stanford University, and Craig Volden, a professor of public policy and politics at the University of Virginia, explain gridlock by pointing to two interrelated factors: first, "the preferences of members of Congress regarding particular policies" and second, "supermajority institutions - the Senate filibuster and the presidential veto". As a result, they argue, gridlock is not determined by party control of the government, but rather by an interplay between the existing policy and the spectrum of individual preferences held by congressional representatives. They maintain, in essence, that "the policy preferences of Members of Congress at or near the median are among the crucial determinants of policy outcomes."

Marcus Ethridge, an emeritus professor of political science at the University of Wisconsin–Milwaukee, argues in a 2011 policy analysis published by the libertarian Cato Institute that the U.S. Constitution was designed to foster gridlock in order to increase "the likelihood that policies will reflect broad, unorganized interests instead of the interests of narrow, organized groups." Ethridge presented an extended version of his analysis in The Case for Gridlock: Democracy, Organized Power, and the Legal Foundations of American Government (2010), which argues that "progressive reformers sought to shift the power to shape policy from the legislative branch to the executive bureaucracy" in an attempt to limit the power of special interests, but that this strategy backfired because of "the ability of interest groups to infiltrate the bureaucracy and promote their interests, often in ways diametrically opposed to the reformers' intentions" and "the capacity of Congress to overcome the influence of groups and generate policy change." In order to counter this, Ethridge suggests a "return to the 'constitutional principle' of gridlock, in which special interests must compete in a legislative forum".

Researchers such as David R. Jones blame ‘higher party polarization increase[s] the likelihood of encountering gridlock’. When looking at figures of polarization within U.S. politics ‘partisan antipathy is deeper and more extensive – than at any point in the last two decades’ with 92% of Republicans being to the right of the median Democrat, and 94% of Democrats aligning to the left of the median Republican voter. This modern polarization paired with a system designed to operate on Burkean representation, not today's party-line voting, leads us to seemingly inevitable gridlock.

Westminster systems
In parliamentary systems based on the Westminster system, parliamentary deadlocks may arise when an election results in neither or none of the major political parties having the numbers in the lower house (the house where the government is formed) to form a government, or when the votes in a lower house of parliament are so close that a government cannot be sure of getting its legislation passed through the house, or when another party (usually referred to as the opposition party) controls a majority of votes in the upper house. 
(Example: two friends in a group of two both have different ideas but neither one wants to do the others idea; that is what you could call political deadlock).

A recent innovation has been to remove the power of the upper house to block supply, as well as some other bills.

The Australian Constitution provides a mechanism for breaking a deadlock between the two houses of Parliament, by means of a double dissolution and, if the deadlock is still not resolved, by a joint sitting of both houses of parliament.

See also 
 Budget crisis
 Cabinet crisis
 Constitutional crisis
 Government shutdown

References

Political terminology